Rudolf Freidhof (September 23, 1888 – December 25, 1983) was a German politician of the Social Democratic Party (SPD) and a member of the German Bundestag.

Life 
After 1945, Freidhof was a member of the SPD and of the State Assembly of Hesse, which advised on the constitution. From 1946 to 1949 he was a member of the Hessian State Parliament and from 1946 to 1947 chairman of the SPD state parliamentary group. Freidhof was a member of the Bundestag from 1949 to 1957, elected directly in the Eschwege constituency.

Literature

References

1888 births
1983 deaths
Members of the Bundestag for Hesse
Members of the Bundestag 1953–1957
Members of the Bundestag 1949–1953
Members of the Landtag of Hesse
Members of the Bundestag for the Social Democratic Party of Germany